Growing Up Gotti is an American reality television series that aired on A&E. It featured the life of Victoria Gotti, daughter of Mafia boss John Gotti, and her three sons; Frank Gotti Agnello, John Gotti Agnello Jr., and Carmine Gotti Agnello. The production of the pilot episode was announced in January 2004 with the show being picked up several months later. A&E canceled Growing Up Gotti after three seasons. In 2014, the network aired an anniversary special Growing Up Gotti: Ten Years Later.

Episodes

Reception
Shirleen Holt of Film.com said that "Victoria Gotti has the warmth of an ice pick and her sons the charm of, well, thugs." Robert Hofler, reviewing the show for Variety, said that the show is too much controlled and focused on Victoria Gotti who also acts as an executive producer, and added, "A&E has the potential for a sleeper hit with its new reality TV show [...] but they clearly muffed the title. "Mommy as Monster" is closer to the target." Alessandra Stanley of The New York Times said that the show is "a one-joke novelty item, but it is at times quite funny and Ms. Gotti is an oddly compelling figure.". Genovese Crime Family Soldier Ciro Perrone and Ralph Scopo were recorded on tape criticizing the show, with Perrone commenting "It's a soap opera, and the kids look like girls.".

Reunion
On November 10, 2014, the network aired a one-hour anniversary special entitled Growing Up Gotti: Ten Years Later. The special featured Victoria Gotti and her three sons who reunited to talk about the highlights of their family reality series. Growing up Gotti: 10 Years Later was produced by Left/Right.

References

External links
 
 

2004 American television series debuts
2005 American television series endings
2000s American reality television series
A&E (TV network) original programming
English-language television shows
Gotti family